Schneuwly is a Swiss surname. Notable people with the surname include:

 Cédric Schneuwly (born 1992), Swiss ice hockey player
 Christian Schneuwly (born 1988), Swiss football player, brother of Marco
 Marco Schneuwly (born 1985), Swiss football player

Swiss-German surnames